Vignan's Foundation for Science, Technology & Research is in Andhra Pradesh, established in 1997 and designated as a "Deemed to be" University in 2008. The campus occupies 104 acres and has the largest main campus, and enrolls 6,800 students. Vignan is one of the most prestigious and highly ranked NAAC A+ universities in India.

The Vignan Group was founded in Guntur in the year 1977 by Chairman Dr. Lavu Rathaiah. "With 45 years of Academic Excellence and unwavering support from the community of students and parents, Vignan offers quality education in a diverse and intellectually engaging atmosphere”. As a visionary educator, Vignan has grown manifold into a large and diverse educational group exploring new frontiers in the world of education, from preschool to Ph.D and postdoctoral levels.

Sri. Lavu  Krishnadevarayulu serves as the Vice Chairman of Vignan University and is an Indian politician who currently serves in the 17th Lok Sabha as an M.P.

Under the magnified umbrella of Vignan, it has 7 Engineering Colleges, 3 Pharmacy Colleges, 1 B. Ed. College, 1 Degree College, and 1 P.G. College and the University, 6 Junior Colleges, and 20 Schools together include about 45,000 students studying at Vignan Group of Institutions across the state of AP and Telangana.

Main Campus 

The Varsity’s prime campus is on a sprawling 72-acre arena located 15 km away from the city of Guntur and 11 km from Tenali town.The main entrance is on the Guntur-Tenali Highway. The Administrative Block (A-Block)  has a prominent feature of 5 floors. There is another entrance  to the varsity campus on the Tenali-Guntur Highway. It is called, “Lara Institute of Technology & Science College entrance.

The University Library is a central facility that supports teaching-learning and research activities. It has a built up area of 5,902 m2 and a huge collection of 1,01,651 books with 6748 e-journals pertaining to all fields. Everyday, 1,802 students and 104 teachers visit the library. It is well connected with the campus network. This has established a conducive learning environment through wi-fi.

Vignan has 43,580 m2 Mega Sports Arena, a 1,548 m2 student activity zone, and 16 auditoriums with 10,500 seating capacity. A total of 114 labs have been exquisitely established to improve academic research and the campus's 2,630 computers have transformed into a highly digitised facility automated for administrative and academic purposes.

Organisation & Administration 

The University offers courses in

I. School of Computing

● Computer Science and Engineering (CS)

● Computer Science and Engineering - Artificial Intelligence and Machine Learning (AI)

● Computer Science and Business Systems (CB)

● Computer Science and Engineering - Cyber Security (CY)

● Computer Science and Engineering – Data Science (DS)

● Information Technology (IT)

II. School of Electrical, Electronics and Communication Engineering

● Biomedical Engineering (BM)

● Electrical and Electronics Engineering (EE)

● Electronics and Communication Engineering (EC)

III. School of Civil, Mechanical, Chemical and Textile Engineering

 ● Chemical Engineering (CH)

● Civil Engineering (CE)

 ● Mechanical Engineering (ME)

 ● Robotics and Automation (RA)

 ● Textile Technology (TT)

IV. School of Natural Sciences & Applied Technology

● Agriculture Engineering (AG)

● Bioinformatics (BI)

● Biotechnology (BT)

● Food Technology (FT)

V. Department of Sciences and Humanities -B.Sc (Math, Statistics.Computer Science), M.A English, M.Sc- Chemistry

VI. Department of Management Studies (BBA, MBA)

VII. Department of Pharmaceutical Sciences - B.Pharmacy

VIII. Institute of Law- BA.LLB (Hons), BBA.LLB (Hons)

also offers honors degrees, Ph. D programmes, Distance & Online Education and 22 other elective academic programmes.

Notable Alumni and Faculty:

The notable faculty of Vignan University has a 520+ & Trainers- vibrant policy for recruiting quality trainers. 40% of them are recruited from elite institutions like IIT’s & NIT’s and 2,054 research publications have been done during the last 5 years at an average of 4.3 papers per faculty in SCI/Scopus Journals. Involving subject matter experts at national & International level in the University Research Board and 10% of total faculty are involved for research.

The technical training, awareness of global happenings, Subject Matter Experts Seminars, L&D, Soft Skills. An yearly average of 400+ faculty members are funded to attend workshops/conferences at national and international level. An average of 45-50 workshops have been hosted on research, IPR, Technology advancement, Entrepreneurship & Skill Development. An amount of Rs. 2 crore budget was allocated to ensure smooth conduct of events and workshops.

Notable illuminous Alumni of Vignan

Mr. Phanindra Sama RedBus, Co-Founder & CEO

Mr. ES Chakravarthy, Global EMG Head & Vice President

Anil Ravipudi, Indian Film Director

K.T. Rama Rao, Minister of Municipal Administration & Urban Development (Telangana)

Jr. N.T. Rama Rao, Indian Actor, * Vignan group

A.Sridhar, IAS..5th Ranker, Civil services

M. Suryateja, IAS.. 76th Ranker, Civil services

Supporting Infrastructure:

A Well furnished, good ventilated 200+ classrooms built in the area of 72,000 Sq.Mts. 127 ICT enabled classrooms, 80 with smart facilities and seating capacity of 60-65 students per room. Average classroom area is 89.53 Sq.Mts against the AICTE norms of 66 Sq.Mts. 36 Wi-Fi & Google enabled tutorial rooms

Hostel :

-Five blocks with 2,4,6 stay facility with AC and Non-AC availed by 35% students -24x7 healthcare support with two resident doctors

-Separate Gym facilities for both Boys & Girls

- an open air gymnasium

Transport:

Vignan has a fleet of over 60 buses plying within the radius of 50 km to commute 3, 215 students and staff each day.

Food:

“The University has a mesmerising food court zone called, “Most Happening Place”, a quick bite multi-cuisine restaurant with 400 seating capacity that serves North-Indian, South-Indian, Continental and Chinese dishes.

Accreditation & Accolades

NIRF:

The University is ranked 95th among the Engineering Colleges in 2022 by the National Institutional Ranking Framework (NIRF).

NAAC & NBA:

The varsity has been accredited by NAAC with ‘A+ Grade, and CSE,ECE,EEE,Mechanical & Biotech accredited by NBA.

12(B) Status:

It has been approved as 12(B) Status & by All India Council for Technical Education (AICTE)

Vignan is also a DSIR Certified Institute by Dept. of Science & Industrial Research, International ranked 95th among the Engineering Colleges in 2022 by the National Institutional Ranking Framework (NIRF).

Academics & Research
Vignan University has an important academic division, Academy for Faculty Development (AFD) which offers orientation, refresher, and need-based courses to Assistant Professors and Associate Professors on campus. Besides  training for the professors, the university provides opportunities for professional development for all faculties in their respective departments. The faculty is also taking on teaching-learning processes and research responsibilities.

The university is a public research university with well-calibrated, high-end research activities in all departments, awarding over 50 doctorates each year. The faculty and students at the varsity are known for carrying out quality research in the natural sciences, social sciences, and humanities.

Major Projects

 Waste Management

Using the "3R Principle" the institution has a green campus, adopting the best practices for Waste Management. As part of this initiative, the campus developed its own sewage treatment plant having a capacity of  600 KL.

 Rain Water Harvesting

In addition to the rooftop rain harvesting system, a 2 acre rain water collecting pond is also developed in the campus, and water can be used in plantations and other areas.

 Biogas plant

This plant was established with an investment of Rs.48 Lakhs which processes 1000 kg food waste, generating 78 kg LPG, Biogas per day for facilitating hostel kitchen.

 Use of Bicycles

As part of Green Initiative, the campus has restricted the entry of automobiles into the campus promoting cycles and battery vehicles to move within the campus area.

 Solar Power Plant

In addition to the biogas plant, the campus has installed a renewable energy solar power plant resource with a capacity of 1MV which is exclusively designated for common area lighting.

Student life
The University has an enrolment of over 6,800 students on the  campus and 20,000+ strong Alumni network. Vignan also has International students from 21 countries studying various programmes on the campus.

Campus life at Vignan offers a small community feel in the urban setup. We are  enthusiastic and work towards building strong bond of togetherness to ensure that all students make the most of their personal wonderful university experience and make Vignan another home away from their home. Find your own niche in campus life. Network with fellow students, inside or outside, your dormitory, institution or during academic program. Join student organisations, develop leadership qualities, and vie on-campus jobs and internships. Choose the living, dining, and other options that work best for you.

Co-curricular

Athletics

There are 5 Regular Physical Directors (PDs), 9 Special Coaches and 10 assistants to host, monitor and maintain sports facilities on the campus and activities with an average annual investment of Rs.50 Lakhs. Until now 600 physical fitness collective prizes won at Inter-college, University, Regional, State and National Levels. Vignan Sports Arena can engage 1,000 students at a time.

Student Centric Programs

The University has adopted a culture of making students globally acceptable by practicing student-centric methodologies and it has made all out efforts to bring in regular reforms through incorporating certain valid genuine inputs from the industry also to prepare addressing the lacunae in designing student-centric curriculum in line with AICTE and the Industry. This overhauling process takes place every 3 years giving an edge to the practicing approaches wherein students learn to collaborate, team up with other peers in completing, mentoring projects and getting started towards the research aspects. These tasks and activities generate enormous strength to the education system to ensure self-dependence of students and help them become more responsible towards the community practicing values with humane touch.

STUDENTS ACTIVITY COUNCIL

The Student Activities Council (SAC) is a student-run programming organisation dedicated to enhancing the college experience for all students at Vignan’s University. SAC seeks to provide educational, entertainment, cultural, and recreational opportunities to complement students' academic experiences and serve as their advocate. We encourage students' participation and strive to foster a sense of community on campus.

CULTURAL CLUBS

There are 20+ optional clubs of SAC including Dance, Literary, Environmental, Music, Theatre Arts, Film & Photography, Fine Arts, Toast Monsters, Pick-a-book etc. Annual budget of Rs.35 Lakhs is allocated for the purchase of equipment for the clubs.

LEARNING & DEVELOPMENT

Learning & Development plays a pivotal role for any organisation’s growth and it is a never ending process. To ensure and engage student constant learning activity, specific programs are designed, developed, implemented to enhance and excel the skills in 1, 250 Courses, supporting Skill Development programmes wherein 400+ Faculty members are financially aided to attend national workshops. Nearly 5, 403 Students are trained in 3 years. 8 additional SD Labs have been established with Rs. 6.91 Cr and 45 workshops are organised every year.

HIGHER EDUCATION ASSISTANCE

Students who are interested going abroad for higher studies after VIGNAN, are continuously mentored, assisted, guided and hand- held until they make their path to realise their dreams. 36 Students have been financially aided for attending/participating in the International Student Exchange Programme in Singapore, South Korea, Japan, Germany & France.

UPSC / GATE / CAT / GRE  additional training is offered as a special initiation for advanced learners. Students with interest and aspirations to learn, grow and turn into Civil Servants are also guided, motivated and mentored through proper coaching.

PROJECTS & INCUBATOR, ENTREPRENEURSHIP CELL

The institution has a highly enabling ecosystem for Research, Innovation, Incubation, Entrepreneurship, and Technology transfer. It takes the support from the Guidance and

Monitoring Committee which comprises the Deans and Senior faculty members. The Directorate of IES is an Innovative Hub that nurtures entrepreneurial endeavors on campus.

 MoU signed with The Indus Entrepreneurs (TiE), Hyderabad to scale up business ideas.
 MoA signed with the National Research Development Corporation (NRDC), Govt., of
 India in 2020 to transfer and commercialise the technologies.
 MoA signed with the M/s 30M Genomics , Dwarakatirumala, West Godavari, A.P in 2021
 MoU signed with Aqua Exchange Agritech Private Limited, Bheemavaram, A.P in 2021
 Kalam Program for IP Literacy and Awareness (KAPILA) was established
 Ministry of Education’s Innovation Cell (MIC) in 2022.

Vignan Online Degree Programs
The University is Entitled by University Grants Commission (UGC) to offer Online Degree Programs. All Online Programs are approved by All India Council for Technical Education (AICTE) and UGC-DEB. UGC and (AICTE) are statutory bodies under Ministry of Education, Government of India.

References

External links
 http://www.vignan.ac.in

Deemed universities in India
Deemed universities in Andhra Pradesh
Universities in Guntur
Science education in India
1997 establishments in Andhra Pradesh
Educational institutions established in 1997